Rodolfo A. Falcón Cabrera (born October 25, 1972 in Havana, Cuba) is a 3-time Olympic swimmer from Cuba, and has been called the country's best swimmer ever. Since 2006, he has been the country's National Commissioner for swimming.

He swam for Cuba at the 1992, 1996, and 2000 Olympics. At the 1996 Games, he won the silver medal in the 100 back ahead of countryman Neisser Bent—these represent the one swimming Olympic medals won by a Cuban. Falcón retired from the sport in 2002.

At the 1998 Central American and Caribbean Games, he set the Championship Record in 100 backstroke at 56.00, which still stands as the record as of 2009.

References

1972 births
Living people
Sportspeople from Havana
Cuban male swimmers
Male backstroke swimmers
Pan American Games gold medalists for Cuba
Pan American Games silver medalists for Cuba
Pan American Games bronze medalists for Cuba
Swimmers at the 1991 Pan American Games
Swimmers at the 1992 Summer Olympics
Swimmers at the 1995 Pan American Games
Swimmers at the 1996 Summer Olympics
Swimmers at the 1999 Pan American Games
Swimmers at the 2000 Summer Olympics
Olympic swimmers of Cuba
Olympic silver medalists for Cuba
Medalists at the FINA World Swimming Championships (25 m)
Medalists at the 1996 Summer Olympics
Olympic silver medalists in swimming
Pan American Games medalists in swimming
Universiade medalists in swimming
Goodwill Games medalists in swimming
Central American and Caribbean Games gold medalists for Cuba
Competitors at the 1993 Central American and Caribbean Games
Competitors at the 1998 Central American and Caribbean Games
Universiade gold medalists for Cuba
Central American and Caribbean Games medalists in swimming
Medalists at the 1993 Summer Universiade
Competitors at the 1998 Goodwill Games
Medalists at the 1991 Pan American Games
Medalists at the 1995 Pan American Games
Medalists at the 1999 Pan American Games
20th-century Cuban people
21st-century Cuban people